The 2011–12 season of the Regionalliga was the 53rd season of the third-tier football league in Austria, since its establishment in 1959.

In the three Regional Leagues (East, Central, and West), teams played two heats for advancement into the First League.  Two of the three teams would qualify.  In 2011–12, the champion of the Regional League West (WSG Wattens) met the Regional League East champion SV Horn in the qualification, while the Regional League Central champion GAK met the First League last-place finisher.  Insofar as the relegated teams did not have other arrangements, three teams had to move down to the fourth level league.

Method
The Regional Leagues East, West, and Central constitute the third level of play in Austrian soccer.  The Regional League East is made up of the clubs in the Vienna, Lower Austria, and Burgenland soccer associations.  The Regional League Central is composed of clubs in the Upper Austria, Carinthia, and Styria soccer associations.  The Regional League West is made up of the clubs in the Salzburg, Tyrol, and Vorarlberg soccer associations.

Clubs in these leagues play for a relegation place in the First League.  The prerequisite for a possible promotion is the granting of a license by the fifth senate of the Bundesliga.

The three last place teams of the Regional Leagues have to move down to the fourth level of play.  If more clubs move down from the First League, the number of clubs that must move down to the fourth level will go up as well.  If two clubs move down from the First League that belong to the federal states that comprise the Regional League Central, four teams from the Regional League Central would need to move down.

Regional League East

Championship final standings

Promoted from the Landesligen
 Viennese City League: SC Ostbahn XI
 Landesliga Lower Austria: SC Retz
 Burgenland League:  SV Oberwart

Regional League Central

Championship final standings

Promoted from the Landesligen
 Landesliga Upper Austria: SV Wallern
 Landesliga Styria: SC Kalsdorf
 Landesliga Carinthia: SV Feldkirchen

Regional League West

Championship final standings

Promoted from the Landesligen
 Salzburg League: SV Wals-Grünau
 Landesliga Tyrol: no promoted club
 Landesliga Vorarlberg: FC Andelsbuch

External links
Regionalliga Ost 
Regionalliga Mitte 
Regionalliga West 

Austrian Regionalliga seasons
Austria
2011–12 in Austrian football